Spongilla lacustris is a species of freshwater sponge from the family Spongillidae. It inhabits freshwater rivers and lakes, often growing under logs or rocks. Lacustris is a Latin word meaning "related to or associated with lakes". The species ranges from North America to Europe and Asia. It is the most common freshwater sponge in central Europe. It is the most widespread sponge in Northern Britain, and is one of the most common species of sponges in lakes and canals. Spongilla lacustris have the ability to reproduce both sexually and asexually. They become dormant during winter. The growth form ranges from encrusting, to digitate, to branched, depending upon the quality of the habitat.

Classification 
Spongilla lacustris is part of the class demosponges of the phylum Porifera. The Porifera phylum contains all sponges which are characterized by the small pores on the outer layer, which take in water. The cells in the sponge walls filter food from the water. Whatever is not uptaken by the sponge is pumped through the body out of a large opening. The class demosponges are the most abundant and diverse of the sponge classes. Some of the sponges in this class have skeletons made from silicon-containing spicules, spongin fibers, or both. Demosponges include both marine and freshwater sponges.

Reproduction 
Freshwater sponges reproduce both sexually and asexually, exhibiting two methods of asexual reproduction: by gemmules and by budding.

Gemmules: Gemmules are elaborate, highly-resistant resting stages formed by freshwater sponges. Gemmules can be produced at any time during the growing season, but most production occurs in the autumn, triggered by seasonal changes in light and temperature.  They form by migration of food-filled archaeocytes, also called amoebocytes, into discrete masses. This archaeocyte core becomes enveloped in several different hardened membrane layers, forming a shell. Gemmules are able to withstand repeated freezing and thawing, desiccation and prolonged darkness. When environmental conditions improve and water temperature exceeds 13 to 23 °C, germination occurs and the young sponge leaves its shell and starts a new animal.

Budding: The second asexual method is budding. This occurs in springtime when the sponge forms buds in its outer layer. These will eventually drift away from the original structure to form a new colony.

Sexual: The summer is when sexual reproduction occurs. These freshwater sponges are hermaphroditic, meaning that each sponge produces both sperm and egg. The sperm are released into the water where they will travel into another sponge's ostia. The sponge subsequently gives birth to live, free-swimming larvae after developing in the sponge's inner cavity.

Habitats 
Spongilla lacustris are freshwater sponges that prefer shallow, clear waters. They are commonly found in ponds, lakes, and slow-moving waters. They can be found both protected from the sun under rocks and logs, and on reeds and on rocks where there is more exposure.

Diet and Food Chain 
Spongilla lacustris are filter eaters that consume small floating organic particles. They are consumed by Sisyridae, a group of winged insects also known as sponge flies. Their larvae act as parasites on the sponge and feed exclusively on it during its larval period. Ceraclea are insects that not only feed on the sponges but will use the sponges' spicules to build hard, protective cases for themselves.  As the larva grows, it not only adds spicules to its casing but pieces of the sponge itself. When the ceraclea reaches adulthood and leaves the sponge, it carries and disburses fragments, thus facilitating the formation of new sponge colonies.

Characteristics 
Spongilla lacustris can appear in several forms, including branching, clump-like, or crust. On average, the sponge grows to be a few inches in length. The color ranges from white to green, depending on the amount of zoochlorella, a green algal tissue, available. The algal tissue has a symbiotic relationship with the freshwater sponge. The algae help facilitate oxygen and food uptake for the sponge, while the sponge provides the algae a surface to live on.

The texture of the sponge itself is soft. The ostia (dermal pores) let water into the sponge to be filtered. The oscula is the hole from which water exits. Although the oscula is bigger than the ostia, both are extremely small and difficult to see. Spicules cover the thin dermal membrane, although the texture of the sponge itself is soft. The spicules are made of silica and provide structural support as well as protection. Freshwater sponge spicules come in many sizes and forms, including microscleres, emmula microscleres, and parenchyma macroscleres.

References

Spongillidae
Freshwater animals of Asia
Freshwater animals of Europe
Freshwater animals of North America
Animals described in 1758
Taxa named by Carl Linnaeus